"E Pluribus Wiggum" is the tenth episode of the nineteenth season of the American animated television series The Simpsons. It first aired on the Fox network in the United States on January 6, 2008. It was written by Michael Price and directed by Mike Frank Polcino, and it guest starred Jon Stewart and Dan Rather as themselves. This episode became controversial in Argentina for a joke made about the government of Juan Perón.

Mike Frank Polcino was nominated for Writers Guild of America Award in the animation category for directing the episode.

Plot
Homer leaves work, and when he is reminded that his diet is starting on the first day of the month (which is that day), he decides to have one last binge at Springfield's Fast-Food Boulevard. After filling up, he decides to throw away his wrappers and the contents of his car in a trash can in the shape of Sideshow Mel's head outside of a Krusty Burger, tossing away a leaky battery and a lit match. The acid from the leaky battery eats a hole in a gas main, with the lit match igniting the gas and starting a fire which soon causes nearby gas pipes to explode, completely destroying Fast-Food Boulevard.

At a town hall meeting, the enraged residents of Springfield demand that Fast-Food Boulevard be rebuilt immediately. To fund the reconstruction, a bond measure is proposed. As the next election is not until June the next year, Mayor Quimby moves it to the upcoming Tuesday, making Springfield's presidential primary the first in the nation. Candidates and reporters head to Springfield when they hear the news.

The candidates flock to the Simpsons, who are undecided. Their home is filled with people and their yard is covered with reporters; helicopters and news vans surround the lot. When voting day arrives, an angry Homer and other citizens hold a meeting in Moe's Tavern. Homer suggests the people vote for the most ridiculous candidate, whom they choose after Chief Wiggum suggests himself. The same night, Kent Brockman announces an unexpected turn of events; Springfield has rejected all the leading candidates and voted for 8-year-old Ralph Wiggum. He wins the primary, much to the shock of Lisa Simpson.

Ralph is immediately embraced as the leading candidate, and Homer and Bart become his fans. Lisa, however, is miserable, as she knows how slow Ralph is. A news report (called Headbutt) shows Ralph has no idea of which party's nomination he is seeking. Both the Democratic and Republican parties contend to secure Ralph as their candidate. The leaders of both parties break into Ralph's home, wanting to fight for him. Lisa confronts Ralph amongst the media frenzy, attempting to convince him not to run. Ralph tells Lisa he wants to run so he can bring peace between warring parties and his earnest kind heartedness wins her support. He is proven to be a formidable candidate, and both the Republicans and the Democrats support Ralph for president. The episode ends with a political commercial for Ralph, sponsored by both parties.

Production
"E Pluribus Wiggum" was written by Michael Price. Price and his son came up with the episode's opening set piece during a drive in Palmdale, California. They stopped at a Burger King that had a long scoop on its trash can, for customers to throw away trash from their car. His son commented, "Homer would love that —— he’s so lazy." This led to the creation of the Fast-Food Boulevard, with Price's son suggesting the name. In the episode, when Homer destroys Fast-Food Boulevard, a restaurant named "Vesuvius Pizza" is shown exploding, with pizza sauce coming out of its top like lava. This joke was pitched by Price's son, who had been learning about volcanoes in school.

Cultural references
 The title is a reference to E pluribus unum ("Out of Many, One"), the Latin phrase that appears on United States coins and currency.
 Cheesy McMayor is a parody of McDonald's Mayor McCheese.
 Former President Bill Clinton is seen putting up campaign signs for his wife, Senator Hillary Clinton. Later, in the commercial for Ralph, Bill announces his support for him, adding "but don't tell you-know-who".
 Arianna Huffington and George Will are parodied as guests on the fictional talk show HeadButt. Later, the Huffington character meets with the Springfield Democratic Party and reveals that the flamboyantly gay Julio is her ex-husband—a dig at Mike Huffington, who revealed he was gay after divorcing Arianna.
 Three restaurant chains are referenced throughout the episode: Trader Joe's (parodied as Trader Earth's), Red Lobster (parodied as Dead Lobster) and KFC (parodied as Kentucky Fried Panda).
 Dan Rather's utterance of "Sweet mother of Murrow!" refers to Ethel Lamb Murrow, the mother of prominent television and radio reporter Edward R. Murrow.
 The fictional brand of the cigars Homer smokes is "Jerk-Ass Homer Cigars," a reference to a term coined by Simpsons fans to describe Homer's personality change during Mike Scully's showrunner era when Homer became meaner and less sympathetic about others. This joke was pitched by Al Jean.
 Mr. Burns says that George W. Bush fairly won election in 2004, then adds somewhat sheepishly, "Assuming they don't find those ballot boxes in Ohio". This refers to the 2004 presidential election, in which Ohio's electoral results were challenged in Congress. Also Burns ignoring Bush's victory in the 2000 election refers to the Florida recount and the belief that Bush did not win "fairly" in the first time.
 When the New Hampshire woman decides to shoot the cashier after her husband carelessly says her name, this is a reference to Once Upon a Time in the West.

Reception
An estimated 8.2 million people tuned into the episode. Richard Keller of TV Squad said that it was an episode with many jokes and sight gags, his favorite being the episode's guest stars and the many references. His only disagreement was the abrupt ending.

Robert Canning of IGN said the episode had all the ingredients that seem to make it a classic episode. He enjoyed the theme of Homer and Fast-Food Boulevard, the political mocking, and the centering of Ralph, and like Keller, he felt the show seemed to shun Ralph until the end; he gives the episode a rating of 6/10.

Dan Snierson of Entertainment Weekly reveals (five days after the episode was broadcast) that it received positive reviews from the site, and Ralph Wiggum had their vote.

Controversy
The episode caused controversy prior to its broadcast in Argentina, over an exchange between Lenny and Carl. Carl says "I could really go for some kind of military dictator, like Juan Perón. When he 'disappeared' you, you stayed 'disappeared'!". Carl's comment is a reference to the Dirty War in Argentina, a period of military dictatorship (1976–1983) during which as many as 30,000 Argentines disappeared, and is largely regarded as having begun during Perón's last government with the Triple A, a death squad which killed many left-wing dissidents. However, these disappearances occurred systematically during the military dictatorship, which began almost two years after Peron's death. The clip was viewed on YouTube over ten thousand times in Argentina and some politicians in the country called for the episode to be censored or banned.

, former Argentinian congressman and president of the Juan Domingo Perón Institute said "this type of program causes great harm, because the disappearances are still an open wound here." Some reacted negatively to Lenny's response to Carl's comment: "Plus, his wife was Madonna", a reference to the film Evita where Madonna played Eva Perón. Pepe added "the part about Madonna—that was too much." Pepe's request for banning the episode was rejected by the Federal Broadcasting Committee of Argentina on freedom of speech grounds.

In an unprecedented decision, Fox decided not to air the episode in Hispanic America. In an e-mail sent later to the media, the network said that this decision was based on "the possibility that the episode would contribute to reopen wounds very painful to Argentina". The Federal Broadcasting Committee made it clear that the episode was not aired in Argentina by Fox's own choice. Nevertheless, some national TV networks in the region (such as Caracol in Colombia, Canal 13 in Chile, Televen in Venezuela and TV Azteca in Mexico) have aired the episode. Finally, on February 19, 2013, Telefe broadcast the episode dubbed in Argentina.

FOX Latin America finally aired the episode for the first time on September 6, 2016 after 8 years of censorship, due to the end of Kirchnerism in Argentina and the HD remaster of the episodes.

References

External links

 
 Ralph Wiggum for President in 2008!, a website designed by the Fox network specifically for this episode

 E Pluribus Wiggim script on Springfield! Springfield!

The Simpsons (season 19) episodes
2008 American television episodes
Animation controversies in television
Television controversies in Argentina
Censorship in South America
Television episodes about elections
Juan Perón